Lance Chomyc (born March 2, 1963) is a former placekicker from 1985 to 1993 for the Toronto Argonauts of the Canadian Football League. In 1986 and 1991, he was a CFL All-Star. He was most recently an English teacher at Bear Creek Secondary School in Barrie, Ontario until early 2020.

Further reading
 
 

1963 births
Living people
Canadian football placekickers
Canadian people of Ukrainian descent
Canadian schoolteachers
Ottawa Rough Riders players
Players of Canadian football from Alberta
Canadian football people from Edmonton
Toronto Argonauts players
Toronto Varsity Blues football players